Aleksandr Gendrikson (born 30 August 1954) is a Soviet diver. He competed in the men's 10 metre platform event at the 1972 Summer Olympics.

References

1954 births
Living people
Russian male divers
Soviet male divers
Olympic divers of the Soviet Union
Divers at the 1972 Summer Olympics
Universiade medalists in diving
Universiade silver medalists for the Soviet Union
Medalists at the 1973 Summer Universiade
Sportspeople from Vladivostok